Incognito is a 2009 French comedy film directed by Éric Lavaine.

Plot
Luka, singer-guitarist of Orly Sud underground rock band in the 1990s, ten years later became the king of the new French pop-rock scene by appropriating the songs of a blue notebook fell from a low cover while looking for pictures of his former band. He thinks that these are the songs of his friend Thomas, former bassist Orly Sud disappeared for several years. One day, Thomas reappears ... So start with Luka three days of ordeal during which he must conceal his immense celebrity. He then decides to convince Thomas that he is still at RATP controller and his luxury home and its Mercedes-Benz owned his freeloading Francis buddy blundering, Mime roommate who struggles to break and that Luka posing as a "comedian full of loot."

Cast
Bénabar as Lucas
Franck Dubosc as Francis
Jocelyn Quivrin as Thomas
Anne Marivin as Marion
Isabelle Nanty as Alexandra
Virginie Hocq as Géraldine
Yolande Moreau as Mme Champenard
 as Pasquier
François Damiens as The driver
Pierre Palmade as himself
Michel Denisot as himself
Patrick Pelloux as The nurse

References

External links

 

2009 films
2009 comedy films
2000s French-language films
French comedy films
Films directed by Éric Lavaine
Pathé films
2000s French films